Infernal is the ninth volume in a series of Repairman Jack books written by American author F. Paul Wilson. The book was first published by Gauntlet Press in a signed limited first edition (July 2005) then later as a trade hardcover from Forge (November 2005) and a mass market paperback from Forge (September 2006).

2005 American novels
Repairman Jack (series)